The Mt. Sterling Essex was the final moniker of the minor league baseball teams based in Mount Sterling, Kentucky. In 1912 and from 1922 to 1923, Mt. Sterling teams played exclusively as members of the Class D level Blue Grass League, hosting home games at the Montgomery County Fairgrounds.

History
In 1912, Mt. Sterling, Kentucky first had minor league baseball, with the Mt. Sterling Orphans playing a partial season as members of the six–team Class D level Blue Grass League and finishing in last place. On June 8, 1912, the Kentucky-based Winchester Hustlers, with a record of 13–24, moved to Nicholasville, Kentucky. After compiling a 3–27 record while based in Nicholasville, the franchise moved to Mt. Sterling on June 26, 1912 to complete the season. Under managers Courtney McBrair and Bob Spade, the Orphans finished the 1912 season with an overall record of 31–97, placing 6th in the six–team Blue Grass League The Orphans finished 54.5 games behind the 1st place Frankfort Lawmakers (85–42) in the final standings. The Lexington Colts (60–65), Maysville Rivermen (82–47), Paris Bourbonites (60–69) and Richmond Pioneers (66–64) all finished ahead of Mt. Sterling. It was noted by the Spalding Guide that the Mount Sterling Orphans team "was in poor shape all of the year." The Blue Grass League folded following the 1912 season.

After a decade absence, the Blue Grass League reformed in 1922. The "Mt. Sterling Essex" resumed as members of the reformed six–team Class D level Blue Grass League. The 1922 league franchises were the Cynthiana Merchants (34–30), Lexington Reds (28–36), Maysville Cardinals (33–28), Mount Sterling Essex (30–31), Paris Mammoths (36–28) and Winchester Dodgers (28–36). The "Essex" moniker possibly derived from Mt. Sterling being named after Stirling, Scotland, which was the former home to early settlers.

Resuming play in the 1922 Blue Grass League, the Mt. Sterling Essex finished 4th in the overall standings. With their record of 30–31 under player/manager Hod Eller, the Essex finished 4.5 games behind the 1st place Paris Bourbons in the overall standings. The Maysville Cardinals, with a 16–6 record, won the 1st half standings and Cynthiana Cobblers, with a 25–17 record, won the 2nd half standings. Maysville defeated Cynthiana in the playoffs to win the championship. Mt. Sterling played home games at the Montgomery County Fairgrounds and did not qualify for the playoffs.

In their final season of play, the 1923 Essex finished last in the Blue Grass League standings. With a 38–54 record, Mt. Sterling finished in 6th place, playing under managers Charles Ellis and Hod Eller. The Essex finished 13.5 games behind the 1st place Cynthiana Cobblers in the final standings of the six–team league. No playoffs were held in 1923,  Mt. Sterling permanently folded after the 1923 season, as the Blue Grass League reduced to four teams for their final season of 1924.

Mt. Sterling, Kentucky has not hosted another minor league team.

The ballpark
The Mt. Sterling Essex teams were noted to have played home minor league games at the Montgomery County Fairgrounds in 1922 and 1923. The ballpark had a small grandstand and was located near the racetrack. Today, the fairgrounds are still in use as home to the annual Montgomery County Fair. The Montgomery County Fairgrounds are located on U.S route 60, Mt. Sterling, Kentucky.

Timeline

Year–by–year record

Notable alumni
Hod Eller (1922–1923, MGR)

See also
Mount Sterling Essex players

References

External links
Baseball Reference

Professional baseball teams in Kentucky
Defunct baseball teams in Kentucky
Baseball teams established in 1912
Baseball teams disestablished in 1923
Mount Sterling, Kentucky micropolitan area
Essex
Blue Grass League teams
1912 establishments in Kentucky
1923 disestablishments in Kentucky